Rosice is a town in the South Moravian Region of the Czech Republic.

Rosice may also refer to places in the Czech Republic:

Rosice (Chrudim District), a municipality and village in the Pardubice Region
Cerekvička-Rosice, a municipality in the Vysočina Region
Rosice, an administrative part of Pardubice